The Malaysian Open is a darts tournament which has been held since 2001.

List of tournaments

Men's

Women's

References

External links

1980 establishments in Malaysia
2001 establishments in Malaysia
Darts tournaments